Hugh Hilton Todd  is a Guyanese politician who serves as Minister of Foreign Affairs and International Cooperation of Guyana since 2020.

Early life
Hugh Todd joined the Guyana Defense Force in 1993. In 1995, he received his training at the Britannia Royal Naval College and was promoted sub-lieutenant. He served in the Guyana Defense Force Coast Guard.

In 2001, Todd was co-founder of Linden Television Cable Network for which he served as its Director until 2009. In 2011, he graduated from the University of the West Indies with a Master of Science degree in Global Studies. 

In 2012, he became a lecturer at the University of Guyana, and in 2017 was appointed Assistant Dean.

Minister of Foreign Affairs
On 5 August 2020, Todd was appointed as Minister of Foreign Affairs and International Cooperation in the cabinet of Irfaan Ali. Former minister Carl Barrington Greenidge who handled the border issue with Venezuela at the International Court of Justice has been retained on the team while the case is ongoing. 

Todd was diagnosed COVID-19 positive on 12 August 2020 which resulted in the temporary quarantine and testing of all cabinet members. 

On 17 August 2020, he appointed Robert Persaud as Foreign Secretary.

References

Living people
Foreign ministers of Guyana
Graduates of Britannia Royal Naval College
Guyanese military personnel
Members of the National Assembly (Guyana)
University of the West Indies alumni
Year of birth missing (living people)